Carlos Miguel da Silva Júnior (born 12 June 1972 in Bento Gonçalves, Brazil), better known as Carlos Miguel, is a former Brazilian footballer who played as a midfielder.

Career

He began his career at Grêmio in 1992, but gained prominence with the arrival of coach Luiz Felipe Scolari in 1993. He was successful at Grêmio, winning the Copa Libertadores in 1995.

Having gained experience with Grêmio, in 1997 he moved to Europe, moving to Sporting CP in Portugal, but he did not adapt to the new continent and moved back to Brazil, joining São Paulo.

In 2001, good performances saw him called up to the Brazil squad for the 2001 Confederations Cup by manager Emerson Leão. Carlos Miguel scored the second goal in Brazil's 2–0 victory over Cameroon, with the other goal being scored by Washington. Brazil eventually exited the tournament in the semi-finals. His five matches in the tournament were the only appearances he ever made for the national team.

He retired in 2007 after a spell with Corinthians-AL came to an end.

References

External links 
 
 

Brazilian footballers
Campeonato Brasileiro Série A players
Grêmio Foot-Ball Porto Alegrense players
Sporting CP footballers
São Paulo FC players
Sport Club Internacional players
Sport Club Corinthians Alagoano players
Brazil international footballers
2001 FIFA Confederations Cup players
1972 births
Living people
Association football midfielders